Xiangli is a town of Xing'an County, Guangxi, China. , it has 14 villages under its administration.

References

Towns of Guilin
Xing'an County